Julia Gasper is an English independent academic specialising in early modern literature, and a right-wing political activist affiliated with the English Democrats. She formerly belonged to the UK Independence Party (UKIP). A vociferous critic of LGBT rights, she has generated controversy with comments widely deemed homophobic and transphobic.

In 1987, Gasper obtained a D.Phil. in English Literature from the University of Oxford after studying at Somerville College. She converted her D.Phil. thesis – a study of the role of Protestantism in the work of Thomas Dekker – into her first book; published in 1990, it received a mixed critical reception. She has since published two further books on eighteenth-century European history, on Theodore of Corsica and the Jean-Baptiste de Boyer, Marquis d'Argens, respectively.

Involved in local politics within the Oxford area, she has been a parish councillor for Risinghurst and Sandhills. In 2012 Gasper was selected as UKIP's Parliamentary candidate for Oxford East. She was scrutinised for her anti-LGBT blog posts by LGBT-themed news service PinkNews. When the Sunday Mirror exposed further anti-LGBT comments that she had made on a UKIP members forum, she was denounced by party leader Nigel Farage and stepped down from her position. Changing her allegiance to the English Democrats, she unsuccessfully stood for them in the 2014 European Parliament election and for Oxford City Council in a local by-election.

Academic career
In 1987, Gasper obtained a D.Phil in English Literature from the University of Oxford after studying at Somerville College. Her thesis examined the Protestant plays of Elizabethan English playwright Thomas Dekker.
In 1990, Clarendon Press published Gasper's work The Dragon and the Dove: The Plays of Thomas Dekker. Writing in The Yearbook of English Studies, John Stachniewski of the University of Manchester described the book as "trenchant and well-informed" and expressed the view that he found Gasper's thesis – that Dekker's dramatic works subscribed to a militant Protestant ideology – to be "convincing". John Harmon of Syracuse University reviewed Gasper's book for the English Studies journal, describing it as "crisply researched" and "eminently readable" although thought that she argued "somewhat defensively" that scholars should take Dekker's work more seriously. Reviewing the book for The Review of English Studies, T. H. Howard-Hill of the University of South Carolina noted that despite the work's title, it did not examine all of Dekker's 26 plays but only a selection of them. While noting that the work was "thoroughly researched, well documented, and densely written", Hill also opined that it was "disjointed, digressive, repetitive, and rambling" and felt that it did not "convincingly illustrate Decker's militant Protestant orientation" in some of the plays that she had discussed.

In 2013 the University of Delaware Press published her book Theodore von Neuhoff, King of Corsica: The Man behind the Legend. Reviewing the book for the European Review of History, José Miguel Escribano Páeza of the European University Institute noted that Gasper brought a novel approach to her examination of the Corsican monarch. Although describing the "exciting" work as an "interesting exercise in historical biography", he noted that Gasper paints a "hagiographic image" of von Neuhoff, for instance by unconvincingly portraying him as a "military genius" and by falling into "the trap of seeing things in black and white by frequently presenting Neuhoff and his followers as heroes fighting against villains."

Political activity
Gasper served as a parish councillor for Risinghurst and Sandhills, and had founded the Windmill Road Residents' Association and the Friends of Bury Knowle Library. The International Business Times characterised her as a "right-wing political activist".

UKIP candidacy: 2012–2013

In early 2012, UKIP selected Gasper to represent them as their Parliamentary candidate for Oxford East, while she also began campaigning to be elected onto Oxford City Council. Asserting that "my central message is to take back control of this country", she campaigned on a platform of promoting the UK's removal from the European Union, opposing "mass immigration", abolishing university tuition fees, and increasing the state pension.

During her campaign, a resident in the Oxford area discovered a blog post which Gasper had authored in 2010; concerned about its contents, they contacted the LGBT-themed news service Pink News, which then reported on it. Stating that homosexuality was not a sexual orientation but a "form of behaviour", in her post Gasper suggested that same-sex attraction was a choice, before criticising gay people for "complaining constantly of persecution" and being insufficiently grateful to heterosexuals for creating them. Asserting that legal support for LGBT rights had "gone too far", she condemned same-sex marriage and the adoption of children by same-sex couples as "wholly unacceptable", and argued that there were strong links between male homosexuality and paedophilia. Her statements generated outrage, with a UKIP spokesperson commenting that while the party did not endorse Gasper's views on this issue, it did uphold her right to hold and express them.

Later that month Gasper complained that readers of Pink News had threatened her, declaring that they should be forcibly institutionalised under the Mental Health Act. In doing so, she compared her situation to that of Salman Rushdie during The Satanic Verses controversy. She then claimed that she had received email death threats and was under police protection, assertions that local police refused to either confirm or deny. Commenting to Cherwell, she claimed her views on LGBT issues were "very, very middle ground" and that she had not said anything homophobic, but been the victim of "a malicious witch hunt". Roweena Russell, former chair of the International Gay Lesbian Bisexual Transgender Youth and Student Organisation, emailed Gasper to discuss the latter's comments, to which Gasper responded that Russell too should be institutionalised. Russell proceeded to condemn Gasper, stating that "as a long-term political activist I'm disgusted she used this kind of language. Using mental health as a slur on top of everything else she's doing is just unacceptable." Rafe Jeune, chair of Oxford's Pride parade, characterised Gasper's comments as "abhorrent" and "disgusting", noting that there was no evidence to link paedophilia and homosexuality.

In the 2010 United Kingdom general election Gasper came fifth in her constituency with 2.3% of the vote (1,202 votes).

In January 2013, the Sunday Mirror revealed that in a UKIP members' online forum Gasper had condemned LGBT rights as a "lunatic's charter", while saying that some homosexuals prefer sex with animals over that with other humans, and reiterating her belief in a link between homosexuality and paedophilia. The newspaper characterised the comments as "extremist and offensive" and noted that the forum contained many homophobic and racist statements from UKIP members. When The Sunday Mirror asked for comment, Gasper stated that "I'm not going to talk about them. It's none of your business." Political commentator Nick Cohen, commenting in The Observer, described Gasper as an advocate of "dumb prejudice".

The forum was shut down, Gasper resigned from her position as chairman of UKIP's Oxford branch, and a number of her supporters were also removed from the committee. A party spokesperson stated Gasper had stepped down "to avoid doing herself or the party any more damage". Gasper insisted the withdrawal was her own decision, adding that she had been the victim of a "press vendetta". UKIP stated that her resignation as Oxfordshire branch chair was welcome, but she would not be forced out of the party altogether. However, UKIP leader Nigel Farage condemned Gasper's "war against homosexuals" as "unacceptable", while Olly Neville, former chairman of UKIP's Young Independent wing, tweeted a message of support for Gasper's removal, stating that "her disgraceful views have no place as a rep[resentative] of a mainstream party".

Gasper later lambasted UKIP as being "plagued with transsexuals", a reference to the trans women Nikki Sinclaire and Kellie Maloney, both of whom have served as candidates for the party. Asserting that she refused to recognise trans women as women, she declared Maloney to be "absolutely grotesque" and added that her transition was "totally barmy – and how pathetic that he [sic] can do nothing better with his life." In May, a former UKIP activist, Colin Cortbus, also publicly revealed to Cherwell that in emails Gasper had sent to him she had again emphasised a connection between homosexuality and paedophilia, and had described the Quran as a "fascist" book, comparing it to Adolf Hitler's Mein Kampf and describing Islam as "a severely oppressive ideology".

In November 2013, Gasper was criticised for an essay entitled "The Myth of the Homocaust", which she uploaded to her academia.edu account. It argued that LGBT rights activists had fabricated the extent of the Nazi persecution of homosexuals.
Olivia Marks-Woldman, chief executive of the Holocaust Memorial Day Trust, criticised Gasper's arguments as disappointing: "Whilst it is important to recognise the differences between the ways the Nazis persecuted different groups, this shouldn't lead us to question the fact that thousands of gay men suffered appalling persecution because of their sexuality."

English Democrats: 2014–2016

Disillusioned with UKIP, Gasper switched her allegiance to the English Democrats.
In April 2014, she declared there were far too many gay people in the Houses of Parliament, deeming this a "violation of democracy". Claiming that only 1.5% of the population was gay, she stated this could justify no more than ten gay MPs, far less than the hundreds that she alleged existed. In the same post, she called for the gay networking and dating app Grindr to be banned as a threat to "public health". Questioned by the BBC, the English Democrats' party spokesman Steve Uncles defended Gasper's "personal opinion", which he claimed was based on a traditional, Christian understanding of sexuality, adding that she was "factually correct" in her claims regarding the number of homosexuals in Parliament. Conversely, her statistics were dismissed as "absurd" by the Oxford University Student Union's LGBT representative; they characterised Gasper's comments as representing evidence of the continuing existence of those with "alarming prejudices" who "wish to actively discriminate against LGBTQ people".

The following month, Gasper commented on the resignation of Brendan Eich as CEO of Mozilla after it was revealed that he had financially supported a group campaigning to prevent the legal recognition of same-sex marriage in California. Gasper claimed Eich had been "victimised by a queer mafia that takes a vindictive pleasure in bullying and abusing people" and that this "Homo fascism is a threat to fundamental human rights." Among those she accused of contributing to this campaign were US President Barack Obama, British Prime Minister David Cameron, Deputy Prime Minister Nick Clegg, the Labour Party, the United Nations, the European Union, Amnesty International, the Archbishop of Canterbury Justin Welby, the Bishop of Buckingham Alan Wilson, Pope Francis, the actor Daniel Radcliffe, all European and American universities, and media such as The Guardian, The Daily Mail, and The Huffington Post. The following day, she condemned World AIDS Day as a celebration of HIV/AIDS and homosexuality, claiming it "congratulates" people for "spreading the disease". Some days later she claimed that in campaigning for legal recognition of same-sex marriage, "queer thugs and gangsters" had "used violence, threats, censorship, abuse, and every form of dirty tactic". She hoped that "a twinge of guilt... kills them".

In May, Gasper stood as the English Democrats' candidate for the South East England region in the European Parliament elections, gaining the votes of 0.76% of the electorate (17,771 votes). Following the resignation of the Labour councillor for Quarry and Risinghurst on the Oxford City Council, Gasper stood as the English Democrats' candidate for the seat, coming last with 43 votes.

After this failure, Gasper returned to her blog to argue there were "far too many homosexual comedians on TV", focusing her criticism on Graham Norton, "the horrid little Alan Carr", and "the unctuous Stephen Fry [...] portly, preening and self-satisfied." She also posted that homosexuals were not persecuted anywhere in the world and that claims to the contrary, such as those regarding the murders of Matthew Shepard and David Kato, were "fraudulent". Pink News, she said, operated as a "mafia" and had placed the actor Rupert Everett on its "hit list", forcing him to obtain police protection. In October 2014, Pink News founder Benjamin Cohen claimed this constituted libel and threatened legal action against her. Gasper responded that she did not simply stand by what she had said, but that she was "proud of it and I have morality on my side". The day after singer David Bowie died in January 2016, she posted on her blog that he was a "famous queer Nazi", adding her view that there was "a remarkable affinity" between Nazism and the LGBT rights movement. The following month she used Twitter to complain that Oxford University's Bodleian Library had tweeted in support of LGBT History Month; in her message, she stated that it was "a disgrace to Oxford" and that "this unsavoury paedophile movement should have no publicity or promotion from any university."

Gasper retained her seat as parish councillor for Risinghurst and Sandhills at the 2016 United Kingdom local elections.
In February 2017, she again attracted attention after posting images of Jimmy Savile and Peter Jaconelli to her blog along with the caption "what could be more suitable for annual LGBT History Month than this heart-warming picture of two of Britain's most inveterate paedophiles hand in hand".
Commenting in an article in Cherwell, Samuel Rutishauser-Mills questioned why the media bothered reporting on Gasper's anti-LGBT comments, noting that as a parish councillor her "political significance is tenuous... and scarcely newsworthy or interesting." He warned that excessive coverage of such opinions was counterproductive to the advancement of LGBT rights, by making "extreme homophobia" seem more commonplace than it really is.

Bibliography

References

Year of birth missing (living people)
Living people
Alumni of Somerville College, Oxford
People from Oxford
English Democrats politicians
English nationalists
UK Independence Party parliamentary candidates